Valentine Smith (21 September 1873 – 8 August 1940) was a British rugby union player. He competed at the 1900 Summer Olympics and won silver as part of the Great Britain team in what was the first rugby union competition at an Olympic Games.

References

External links

 

1873 births
1940 deaths
Olympic rugby union players of Great Britain
English rugby union players
Olympic silver medallists for Great Britain
Rugby union players at the 1900 Summer Olympics
Rugby union forwards
Rugby union players from Birmingham, West Midlands